Papuascincus morokanus  is a species of skink found in Papua New Guinea.

References

Papuascincus
Reptiles described in 1936
Taxa named by Hampton Wildman Parker